Kamon (lit. Cumin) is a community settlement in northern Israel. Located in the Galilee on the two eastern peaks of Mount Kammon, it falls under the jurisdiction of Misgav Regional Council.

History
The village was established in 1980 by seven families, who initially lived in mobile homes.

References

Community settlements
Hitahdut HaIkarim
Populated places established in 1980
Populated places in Northern District (Israel)
1980 establishments in Israel